

The Letov Š-50 was a 1930s prototype Czechoslovakian military general-purpose monoplane, designed and built by Letov.

Development

The Š-50 was an all-metal twin-engined low mid-wing monoplane that first flew in 1938. It was powered by two 420 hp (313 kW) Avia Rk.17 radial engines.  It had a fixed landing gear and twin fins and rudders. Following the German occupation, development was stopped.

Specifications

References

Notes

Bibliography

S-50
1930s Czechoslovakian military utility aircraft
Mid-wing aircraft
Aircraft first flown in 1938
Twin piston-engined tractor aircraft